The College of Medicine of the Lagos State University popularly known as LASUCOM is one of the top College of Medicine in Nigeria. 
The college is located within the structure of the Lagos State University Teaching Hospital.
It was established in 1999 under the administration of Col.Mohammed Buba Marwa who donated the building known as Ayinke House to the School.
The college started with training medical student that led to the award of Bachelor of Medicine, Bachelor of Surgery (MB;BS) Degree and expanded to other programmes such as Bachelor of Dental Surgery (BDS), Bachelor of Nursing Science (BN.Sc), Bachelor of Science, Physiology (B.Sc. Physiology), Bachelor of Science, Pharmacology (B.Sc. Pharmacology) and postgraduate programmes in Physiology, Anatomy, Medical Biochemistry and Public Health.It currently has three faculties, 
Basic medical sciences, Basic clinical sciences and Clinical sciences.

LASUCOM is also the fastest growing College of Medicine in Nigeria.

Provosts

{| class="wikitable"
|+LASUCOM PROVOSTS
!NAME
!TENURE
|-
|Prof. Wole Alakija
|1999-July 2004
|-
|Prof. Aba Omotunde Sagoe
|Aug 2003-Feb 2006
|-
|Prof. John O. Obafunwa
|March 2006-Feb 2010
|-
|Prof. B.O. Osinusi
|March 2010-Feb 2012
|-
|Prof. Olumuyiwa O. Odusanya
|March 2012-Feb 2014
|-
|Prof. Gbadebo O. G. Awosanya
|March 2014-Feb 2016
|-
|Prof. Babatunde Solagberu
|March 2016-October 2017
|-
|Prof. Anthonia Ogbera
|November 2017-December 2019
|-
|Prof. Abiodun Adewuya
|January 2020 - December 2021
|-
|Prof. Mobolaji Adewale Oludara
|January 2022 - October 2022
|-
|Prof. Babatunde Solagberu
|October 2022 till date

References

External links
Lagos State University College of Medicine

1992 establishments in Nigeria
Medical schools in Nigeria
Universities and colleges in Lagos